Alexander Dickson may refer to:

 Alexander Dicsone (1558–by 1604), Scottish writer and political agent
 Alexander Dickson (British Army officer) (1777–1840), British army officer
 Alexander George Dickson (1834–1889), Conservative MP
 Alexander Dickson (botanist) (1836–1887), Her Majesty's Botanist
 Alec Dickson (1914–1994), founder of Voluntary Service Overseas 
 Alex Dickson (boxer) (born 1962), British Olympic boxer and former British champion
 Alex D. Dickson (born 1926), American bishop
 A. King Dickson (1870–1938), American college football coach